Vitamin Cottage Natural Food Markets, Inc (commonly referred to as "Vitamin Cottage" or "Natural Grocers") is a Colorado based health food chain.

The business was founded in 1955 as a door-to-door sales operation by Margaret and Philip Isely. They opened the first Vitamin Cottage store in Lakewood, Colorado, in 1963. After Margaret Isely's death in 1997, the Iselys' children took over the business the following year. Beginning in 2008, Vitamin Cottage Natural Grocers phased in a name change to Natural Grocers by Vitamin Cottage, to emphasize that groceries, rather than nutritional supplements, formed a majority of its sales. The company made its initial public offering on the New York Stock Exchange in July 2012, raising $107 million.

Its products include vitamins, dietary supplements, natural and organic food, organic produce and natural body care products.  The company has a manifesto entitled "What We Won't Sell and Why", which includes artificial colors and flavors, artificial preservatives, irradiated food and meat raised using artificial hormones and antibiotics, among others.

The company operated around 162 retail grocery stores in around 20 states, mainly west of the Mississippi River, and had approximately 3,000 employees in 2008.

References

External links
 

1955 establishments in Colorado
Companies based in Lakewood, Colorado
Companies listed on the New York Stock Exchange
Health food stores
Organic food retail organizations
American companies established in 1955
Retail companies established in 1955
Supermarkets of the United States